Sukrit Wisetkaew (born 4 September 1985), commonly known by his nickname Bie, is a Thai singer and actor. He was discovered on the third season of Thai television talent contest The Star. After winning the position as the first runner-up in The Star 3, Bie became one of the hottest rising singers and gained immense popularity after his debut single I Need Somebody. He is well known as Bie The Star.

Besides his career as a singer and an actor in TV drama and sitcom, he was also trained to be a stage actor in several musicals. Behind the Painting is one of his musical masterpieces in which he acted as one of the leading roles.

In 2008, after under 2 years in the entertainment business, Bie became one of The Most Influential People in Thailand, according to a poll by the Thai Positioning magazine and Siamrath.

In May 2015, Bie was to make his American stage debut in the world premiere of WATERFALL, an epic new Broadway bound musical love story, based on a contemporary classic Thai novel, Behind the Painting by Sriburapha, featuring book and lyrics by Tony Award-winner Richard Maltby, Jr.,  music by Oscar- winner and two-time Tony Award nominee, David Shire and directed by Broadway and Thai theatrical impresario Tak Viravan.

Biography

Early life

Bie was born in 1985 in Chiang Mai, Thailand. His nickname Bie comes from his full nickname "Gumbie", which translates to Dragonfly. He has an elder sister named Mangpor whose name also has the same meaning.
Bie attended high school at Montfort College, at Chiang Mai, and he was in the Science/Mathematics program. After that he attended King Mongkut's University of Technology Thonburi at Bangkok, receiving a Bachelor of Engineering ( Mechatronics Engineering) degree in 2009. During his college years, he decided to audition for the third season of The Star.  During college, he spent time both studying and working hard as an actor and singer in the entertainment business.

The Star  2006
In early 2006, Bie auditioned for the third season of The Star. Even though he did not impress all three commentators, he consistently received the highest number of votes each week.  He made it through to become one of the two final contestants, but he did not win the competition. Immediately after becoming runner-up in The Star 3 competition, Bie signed a contract with Exact and GMM Grammy.

2006–2007: Bie the star
Bie is a singer and actor of Exact, under GMM Grammy. After his victory on The Star, he began training under a management agency GMM Grammy. His first single, "I Need Somebody", was released in Thailand in October 2006. After the song peaked on the radio charts for many weeks, it received the award as the number one love song single of 2006 from Star Entertainment Awards, Seed Awards, and In Young Generation Choice Awards.

Besides his career as a singer Bie also took time to star in his first drama series called "Roy Adeed Hang Ruk". It is now in many languages including the Philippines, Cambodian and Indian. With his naturally humorous character, he also has starred in the ongoing sitcom called "Nut Kub Nut" since early 2007 to present. In May 2007, Bie starred in his second drama series called "Hua Jai Sila" with Fang Pichaya.

Following the success of his debut as a singer and actor, Bie was offered by "Thakonkiat Veerawan" managing director of Exact & Scenario, to star in the Musical theatre  "Banlang Mek" as youngest son, Pakorn, starring alongside Sinjai Plengpanich, one of Thailand leading actresses. The musical was extremely successful, with 47 performances, and trained him to become one of Thailand's leading stage stars.

2008 : Most popular star

Bie's second album, I Love You Too, was released on 26 March 2008, and his single "Jungwa Huajai" (Rhythm of the Heart) peaked at number one on many charts in Thailand. The second single from this album called "Someone" also peaked at number one at EFM and Hotwave charts.  Furthermore, this album ranked as one of the best-selling albums of GMM Grammy of the year.

In May, Bie had his first solo concert, "Love Attack". This concert was held in Thailand's biggest concert hall "Impact Arena". This was very surprising to many because he had only been in the entertainment business for only under 2 years.  However ticket sales were through the roof and the concert was sold out in 2 days. A second show was thus added for the viewers. 
His popularity as a singer also won him Singer of the Year Award at the Top Awards and Popular Artist of the Year at Siam Dara Awards.

In August, due to his stage charisma, that he beam and glow on the stage, Bie returned to the stage in an even bigger musical, Behind the Painting (Khang Lang Pharp), with 49 performances. This was his first lead role in a musical, even though he had only recently begun his singing and acting career, especially for musical theatre. In this show, his role was a young Thai student studying abroad in Japan who falls in love with a dynasty woman older than he is, played by Pat Suthasinee who is known as the musical princess of Thailand.

This year his career won him Popular Star of the Year at Nine Entertain Awards. He also won the Influential People of The Year award in Thailand's social circle, by Position and Siamrath.

2009 - present

His single "Maak Maai" (มากมาย: Plenty) from the third album, "Hug Bie" (ฮักบี้: 'Hug' in Northern Thai means love), has more than 5 million digital downloads . This album peaked at number one top digital downloads of GMM Grammy in 2009 and sold more than 1 million copies to date.

Bie came back to star in a drama series called "Prajan See Roong" (พระจันทร์สีรุ้ง: The Rainbow-colored Moon)  with a famous actress Aff Taksaorn. This drama series was not a production of Exact, it was his first time working with "Lakorn Thai" at Channel 3. Bie was not cast for this role but it was given to him by "Da Hathairat", the owner and producer of Lakorn Thai production. Prajan See Roong also awarded Mental Health Media Award 2009, TV Drama of the Year from Nine Entertain Awards 2010 and The Best Drama Award from Siam Dara Stars Awards 2010.

In July, Bie performed a second solo concert called "Love Maak Maai" at Impact Arena hall, tickets were sold out in a day, and so a second show was added to the schedule. This year Bie was also continually awarded Popular Vote Artist Award from Sudsapda awards 2009 and Hot Singer of The Year from TV Inside Hot Awards.

In May 2010, Bie came back with his 4th series which was a comedy, "Dok Ruk Rim Tang" (ดอกรักริมทาง: The sidewalk love flower). The drama had the highest viewer ratings of Exact series in this year.  On July 4, Bie had ordinated into a monk for 10 days. This year he was also awarded Most Popular Star of the Year for 2 Consecutive Years at Nine Entertain Awards and Star Popular Vote from Siamdara Star Awards 2010.

In October 2010 Bie represented Thailand and performed at the 7th Asia Song Festival, organised by Korea Foundation for International Culture Exchange, at the Seoul Olympic Stadium.

On 2 March, a quiz show called Fan Pan Tae aired an episode on Bie. The quiz show was extremely popular, and tested the contestants' wits and knowledge about Bie. While the questions were said to be "ridiculously hard", a woman named Apichaya Chuankao (อภิชญา จวนเก่า) could answer every question on Bie, with an example being "From this picture (which was completely black and white, and showed only Bie's posture), which song is he dancing to?" The final catch of the program was when Bie actually appeared and awarded Apichaya personally- to the surprise of everyone including the audience.

Bie released his first single "Glua Tee Nai" (กลัวที่ไหน: I'm not afraid) and soon released A single called "Rak Na Ka" (รักนะคะ: Love you)  from his new album ' Rak Na Ka ' which was released on the 10 March 2011 and the VCD on the 31 March 2011.

Social Responsibility Activities

Bie has continually participated in socially beneficial activities of Thai society. He also received the honorary awards from many agencies including Outstanding Youth Award 2009 from Ministry of Education, Award for "Filial Children Towards their Mothers" from Ministry of Social Development and Human Security and Diamond Song Award Best Rendition in Thai.

Bie was a Presenter for "Moral Support" campaign, the project worked on areas of which Princess Bajrakitiyabha has expressed concern. In 2008 Office of the Narcotics Control Board had appointed Grammy artist Bie the star presenter, by outstanding pertinacity, in the annual campaign against drugs. Bie was also the Ambassador for "Stop violence towards children, women and family violence" campaign of Ministry of Social Development and Security. Besides, he also participated in "Just Say No" project, a campaign against drugs in 2008.

In 2009, Ministry of Public Health has appointed him a Presenter for "Health Support" campaign. He was also a representative of the KMUTT's graduates, in Outstanding Activities, to present a wrist garland to Her Royal Highness Princess Maha Chakri Sirindhorn, who presided over the Graduation Ceremony 2009. The end of year, Bie had in the special concerts by various artists, in a special event "The Greatest of the Kings, the Greetings of the Land", the 82nd birthday of His Majesty the King, led by the government offices, the theme song King of Kings has been specially composed for this event.

In 2010 Bie started with "The Big Green Miracle" Project of Sudsapda's which he was chosen. The project is about doing good for the community, nature and the environment.

Discography

Studio albums

EPs

Compilation albums

Other special albums

Filmography

TV dramas

 2006 Roy Adeed Hang Ruk ( The past furrow of love) With Mew the star
 2007 Hua Jai Sila ( The heart of rock) With Fang Pichaya
 2009 Prajan See Roong ( Rainbow moon) With Taksaorn Paksukcharern
 2010 Dok Ruk Rim Taang ( Crown flower at the edge of the road) With Wannarot Sonthichai 
 2011 Karm Wayla Tharm Ha Ruk (  Crossing the Time to Find Love) With Sinjai Plengpanich
 2012 Khu Kam ( Sunset at Chaophraya) With Nuengthida Sophon
 2014 Jatt Rak ( Arranged Love) With Nuengthida Sophon
 2017 You're My Destiny ( You Are My Destiny) With 
 2018 Pure Intention ( Pure Intention) With

Musical theatre 

Theatregoers also know him well as Noppon in "Behind the Painting" and Pakorn in "Banlang Mek".

Movie

Sitcoms

 2007–2015 "Nud Kab Nud"
 2016–present "Soot Ruk Chun La Moon"

Master of Ceremony: MC ON TV

 Television

 Online

Concerts

Solo Concert

Presenter

Bie is one of the most popular presenters, for many famous brand products, in Thailand.  In early 2008, Bie was one of Top 5 Popular Presenters, by TV Pool poll. And by the end of year he was awarded "The Most Popular Presenter Award" from OHO awards 2008. In August 2009, he also won "King of Presenter" from Dao-Krajai at Channel 9, and Presenter of the year from Marketeer Magazine, December 2009.

Awards

References

External links
Bie Sukrit Official CDs/DVDs store Worldwide Shipping

Bie Sukrit's Instagram

1985 births
Living people
Sukrit Wisetkaew
Sukrit Wisetkaew
Sukrit Wisetkaew
Sukrit Wisetkaew
Sukrit Wisetkaew
Sukrit Wisetkaew
Sukrit Wisetkaew
Sukrit Wisetkaew
Sukrit Wisetkaew
Sukrit Wisetkaew
Thai television personalities